Dirty Hands: The Art and Crimes of David Choe is a 2008 documentary film about painter and graffiti artist David Choe, directed by Harry Kim.

Over more than a decade, Kim filmed the most intimate and dramatic moments of his best friend David Choe's colorful life as an artist. Dirty Hands began as a film school project, but gradually expanded into a half-hour film entitled Whales and Orgies, then a feature-length documentary. The film premiered at the Los Angeles Film Festival on June 21, 2008 and had a theatrical premiere at the Roxie Theater in San Francisco in May 2010. The end credits song of the film was produced by Grammy nominated music producer Dr. Luke.

References

External links

2008 films
Documentary films about painters
American documentary films
Graffiti in the United States
2008 documentary films
Documentary films about graffiti
2000s English-language films
2000s American films